Jaspreet 'Jazim' Sharma ( born on 14 September 1990 in Bathinda, Punjab, India) is an Indian ghazal singer. He is national level gold-medalist in Thumri and Ghazal. He has been inspired by the ghazal singer Ghulam Ali Khan.

He started singing at the age of 5 and learnt singing from Guru Vijay Sachdeva. After graduating in Music, he moved to Mumbai to do his M.A. in Music from Mumbai University.

Career 
He started his Bollywood career in 2014 by singing the song "Kya Hoga", along with Master Saleem, Shahid Mallya, and Jamal Akbar, in the Hindi film Dedh Ishqiya. 

In 2020, he composed the song "Guzar Jayega" which was a collaboration between 50 singers during the first wave of the coronavirus pandemic.

Singles

References

External links 

1990 births
Living people
Indian male ghazal singers
People from Bathinda
University of Mumbai alumni